Joseph M. Breen (April 23, 1897 – October 13, 1978) was a star football player in  the Canadian Football League for two seasons for the Toronto Argonauts. Later, he coached at the University of Western Ontario and was a referee from 1935 through 1940. He was inducted into the Canadian Football Hall of Fame in 1963 and into the Canada's Sports Hall of Fame in 1975.

References
 Canada's Sports Hall of Fame profile

1897 births
1978 deaths
Players of Canadian football from Ontario
Toronto Argonauts players
Toronto Varsity Blues football players
Canadian Football Hall of Fame inductees
Canadian football officials